Golf at the 2019 Pacific Games was held on 10–13 July 2019 at the Royal Samoa Golf Course in Fagali'i, approximately 5 kilometres south-east of Apia. Men's and women's tournaments were played, with medals awarded for individual and team events in each.

New Caledonia dominated the competition, winning all four gold medals and two silver medals. The host team Samoa won two silver and two bronze, with Fiji and Tahiti taking  home a bronze medal each.

Teams
The nations competing were:

Medal summary

Medal table

Men's results

Women's results

See also
 Golf at the Pacific Games

References

Golf at the Pacific Games
2019 Pacific Games
2019 Pacific Games
Pacific Games